John Novak is a Canadian voice, film and television actor who frequently does work for the Ocean Productions based in Vancouver, Canada.

Biography
He was born in Venezuela to Canadian parents who were visiting the country.

He has also starred in the Wishmaster sequels Wishmaster 3: Beyond the Gates of Hell, and Wishmaster: The Prophecy Fulfilled, replacing Andrew Divoff as The Djinn.

He appeared in Street Justice, twice in the TV series Sliders as a shyster lawyer, Ross J. Kelly, and 3 times in Highlander: The Series.

He most recently starred as the Sheriff in Bloodrayne 2: Deliverance.

Novak is probably best known, in Canada at least, from Kokanee beer commercials, as he plays the Park Ranger who is constantly trying to prevent the Kokanee Sasquatch from stealing the beer.

Filmography 
Ayakashi: Samurai Horror Tales - Shuri Odawara, Yoshiaki Sakai
Barbie: The Pearl Princess - Caligo
Black Lagoon - Cargo Ship Captain, Sonar Operator
Black Lagoon: The Second Barrage - Tsugio Bando
Death Note - Zellogi, Steve Mason
Doctor Who - Salinger
Fantastic Four: World's Greatest Heroes - Supreme Intelligence
Adieu Galaxy Express 999 - Faust
Ghost in the Shell: Stand Alone Complex - The Laughing Man - Kubota
Ghost in the Shell: S.A.C. GIG - Individual Eleven - Kubota
Gintama° - Katakuriko Matsudaira
Home Sweet Home Alone - Johnny
InuYasha - Ungai
Key the Metal Idol - Jinsaku Ajo
Kingdom series - Wang Qi
LEGO Ninjago: Masters of Spinjitzu - Skalidor, Slithraa, Bank Boss, Police Officer, Fangdam
Level Up - Maldark
Mobile Suit Gundam: Encounters in Space - Kelly Layzner
Mobile Suit Gundam SEED - Uzumi Nara Athha
Mobile Suit Gundam SEED: Never Ending Tomorrow - Uzumi Nara Athha
Santa Barbara - Keith Timmons
Silent Möbius 2: The Motion Picture - Combined, Old Man, Monster Alpha
Sliders - Ross J. Kelly
Smallville - Jed McNally / Gary Bergen
Stargate SG-1 - Colonel William Ronson (2 episodes)
Supernatural - Zeus
Tara Duncan: The Evil Empress
The Amazing Zorro - His Excellency, the Governor
The Condor - George Valdez
The Little Prince - Marine (The Planet of Ludokaa, then later in The Planet of the Crystal Tears)
The Story of Saiunkoku - Advisor Yosei Sho, Bandit, General Haku, High Government Official 2, Raien Haku, Visitor
Thor: Tales of Asgard - Thrym, Additional Voices
Ultraviolet: Code 044 - Reindeer
X-Men: Evolution - Bolivar Trask

References

External links 

Living people
Canadian male film actors
Canadian male television actors
Canadian male video game actors
Canadian male voice actors
Male actors from Caracas
Male actors from Vancouver
20th-century Canadian male actors
21st-century Canadian male actors
Year of birth missing (living people)